Hardcash Productions is a British independent television production company set up by David Henshaw in 1992.

Hardcash specialises in current affairs programmes and has won a range of awards - including six Emmys, two BAFTAs, the Prix Italia, four RTS Journalism Awards, three Peabodys and two Griersons. Hardcash most recently won a BAFTA for its 2022 Dispatches programme Beneath The Veil.

The Hardcash name came from an undercover investigation about employers made by Henshaw for the BBC. The programme was never aired for legal reasons. Henshaw set up Hardcash to remake the programme for Channel 4 as an episode of the Cutting Edge series. It was broadcast under the simple title Undercover and started the Undercover Britain and Countryside Undercover strands of the series.

Programmes
 Undercover Mosque
 Undercover Mosque: The Return
 Saudi Arabia Uncovered
 Undercover in Britain's New Far Right
 Qatar - State of Fear?
 The Truth About Disability Benefits
 Will the NHS Care for Me?
 Broke: Britain's Debt Emergency
 Inside Russia: Putin’s War at Home

References

External links
 

Television production companies of the United Kingdom